Dire Straits were an English rock band from London. Formed in June 1977, the group originally included lead vocalist and lead guitarist Mark Knopfler, rhythm guitarist and backing vocalist David Knopfler (his younger brother), bassist and backing vocalist John Illsley, and drummer Pick Withers. At the time of their initial breakup in September 1988, the band featured Mark Knopfler, Illsley, rhythm guitarist and backing vocalist Jack Sonni, drummer Terry Williams, and keyboardists Alan Clark and Guy Fletcher. Knopfler, Illsley, Clark and Fletcher reformed Dire Straits in 1990, touring sporadically with backup musicians before their second breakup in 1995.

History

1977–1988
Dire Straits were formed in June 1977 by Mark and David Knopfler, John Illsley and Pick Withers. The band released their first two studio albums, Dire Straits and Communiqué, in 1978 and 1979, respectively. David Knopfler left the group during the recording of their third album Making Movies in July 1980, following an argument with Mark which prompted him to return to the UK and start a solo career. After the album, which featured Roy Bittan on keyboards, was released in October 1980, Hal Lindes was announced as Knopfler's replacement, while keyboardist Alan Clark was also added. Withers remained until shortly after the completion of the band's fourth album Love over Gold (released in September 1982) at which point he left and was replaced by former Rockpile drummer Terry Williams.

During the Love over Gold Tour, Dire Straits added keyboardist Tommy Mandel, percussionist Joop de Korte and King Crimson saxophonist Mel Collins to their touring lineup, all of whom were featured on the live release Alchemy: Dire Straits Live. In late 1984, Guy Fletcher was added to the band's lineup as a second keyboardist. Lindes left shortly afterwards, during the recording of Brothers in Arms and his place was taken by Jack Sonni. Also during the recording sessions, Williams was temporarily replaced by Omar Hakim, although both are credited with contributing to the album. Williams was back in the band for the album's promotional concert tour which lasted from April 1985 to April 1986, the lineup of which also featured saxophonist and flautist Chris White.

After a break from touring, Dire Straits regrouped for the Nelson Mandela 70th Birthday Tribute concert staged on 11 June 1988 at Wembley Stadium, at which they were the headline act. As Sonni was unable to play the show, Eric Clapton took his place. On 15 September 1988, Knopfler announced the disbanding of Dire Straits. Speaking in a Rolling Stone interview about the breakup, the band's frontman stated that "There's not an accent then on the music, there's an accent on popularity. I needed a rest."

1990–1995
On 30 June 1990, Dire Straits returned for a performance at Knebworth Festival, with Knopfler, Illsley, Clark and Fletcher joined by Eric Clapton and his band – guitarist Phil Palmer, bassist Nathan East, drummer Steve Ferrone, keyboardist Greg Phillinganes, and backing vocalists Katie Kissoon and Tessa Niles. In late 1990/early 1991 Dire Straits officially reformed, with the four members recording their final studio album On Every Street (released in September 1991) with a host of session musicians, including Toto drummer Jeff Porcaro. The album's concert tour featured returning saxophonist White, On Every Street contributors Palmer, Paul Franklin (pedal steel guitar) and Danny Cummings (percussion), and drummer Chris Whitten, all of whom featured on the live releases On the Night and Encores.

Following another hiatus, Dire Straits' final album Live at the BBC (released in 1995) was a contractual release featuring live recordings from 1978 to 1981, with the original line-up of Mark and David Knopfler, Illsley and Pick Withers (Clark and Lindes also featured on one track). In 1995, Mark Knopfler disbanded Dire Straits for the second time, choosing to focus on his solo career.

Members

Official

Touring

Timeline

Lineups

References

External links
Mark Knopfler official website

Dire Straits